The following is the list of teams to overcome 3–1 series deficits mainly concerning North American professional sports. The listed teams won three consecutive games after being down three games to one in a best-of-seven playoff series. This is similar to a comeback from a 2–0 series deficit in a best-of-five playoff series, which also requires winning three straight games, but these are not covered here.

All 3–1 deficit comebacks in a seven-game series involve winning a succession of elimination games, finally featuring a double-elimination game seven. Longer series of this nature are almost always structured as single-elimination knockout tournaments, so the loss of the series ends playoff contention for the losing side.

This playoff structure is common in North American professional sports, particularly in the sports of baseball, basketball, and ice hockey where it's feasible to compete every other day or sometimes back-to-back. Games such as American football and rugby are too physical to support a playoff structure of this nature, requiring longer intervals between games. Soccer is one of the world's most popular sports, and would permit this structure, but soccer tournaments are conventionally structured differently, with larger pools of group play (this is also the case with tournaments of the International Ice Hockey Federation, typically hosted in Europe). Baseball uniquely contains a key position which can not sustain the frequent play schedule, that of the starting pitcher, so the game is structured around a pitching rotation, which pretty much demands a series playoff structure, so that all pitchers appear, to fairly determine the strength of the team as a whole.

Examples outside of North America of the seven-game structure include the Taiwan Series baseball tournament, the final round of the Japan Series, the Chinese, Italian, Lithuanian, Polish, and Turkish baseball leagues, and later rounds of the Gagarin Cup of the Kontinental Hockey League (KHL) based in Russia, Belarus, Kazakhstan and China. Within North America there are also some intermediate leagues below the major league level such as hockey's Calder Cup.

A common comeback scenario is where a heavy favorite digs themselves into a deep hole on early adversity, before reasserting their dominance over a weaker opponent when the chips are down. This explains in part why these comebacks are rare in most sports: powerhouse teams most capable of mounting a comeback don't usually dig themselves into this predicament in the first place.

Additionally, over a longer series, teams adapt to the strengths and weaknesses of their opponent (more so than in regular season play); stronger teams are usually better at making these adjustments, which makes a "Cinderella" comeback by the weaker team that much more difficult to pull off. In team sports where an individual position has the potential for outsize impact (e.g. a starting pitcher in baseball or a goalie in hockey), a comeback can sometimes be leveraged by a weaker team off of a heroic individual performance.

Implicit in overcoming a 3–1 series deficit are all teams who have overcome a 3–0 series deficit. These are noted in the series comment cells and—lacking an explicit column in the tabular format—can be identified with a text search within the article page for the text string "3–0".

Background
Three major North American professional sports leagues have playoff series that can reach a seventh game: Major League Baseball (MLB), the National Basketball Association (NBA), and the National Hockey League (NHL). In the history of these leagues, teams that were down 3–1 in a series have come back to win the series 58 times; 14 times in MLB, 13 times in the NBA, and 31 times in the NHL. The most recent instance was accomplished by the New York Rangers of the NHL in the 2022 Stanley Cup Playoffs.

There have been three instances of a team coming back from a 3–1 deficit twice in the same postseason; occurring once in the MLB, NBA, and NHL. The most recent instance was by the Denver Nuggets in the 2020 NBA playoffs.

Adversity and legend
In some cases, the comeback is intensified by drama within the games themselves, the history of the rivalry between the teams involved, or the stature of the players involved.

NHL
As an example drawn from the National Hockey League, all three of these occurred in the 1989–1990 comeback by the Edmonton Oilers over the Winnipeg Jets.

Under Wayne Gretzky, the Oilers faced Winnipeg in early playoff rounds five times from 1983–1988 (all but 1986) continuing on after defeating Winnipeg to reach the Stanley Cup finals all five times (winning in all but their first appearance). Winnipeg did not win a single playoff game against Edmonton during the Gretzky years until their 17th attempt, after one of the greatest runs of post-season nemesis in major league sports history.

In the 1989–1990 season, the Oilers met Winnipeg again, for the first time without Gretzky, who had been controversially traded to the Los Angeles Kings two seasons prior. In this series, now captained by Mark Messier, the Oilers fell behind 3–1, and were additionally behind by a score of 2–0 midway through the fifth game, before managing a comeback win in the game itself, and then the series, before proceeding to win the only Stanley Cup in Edmonton Oilers history without Wayne Gretzky heading the team.

"During Edmonton's five playoff runs that ended with a Stanley Cup championship (1984, 1985, 1987, 1988 and 1990), the Oilers faced elimination just five times." Three of the five came in this single series against Winnipeg.

Messier would go on to win yet another cup (in addition to five with the Oilers) as captain of the New York Rangers, cementing his reputation as one of the greatest team leaders in sports history, not least on the back of his reputation for having willed his team to victory in this desperate 3–1 series comeback against the Winnipeg Jets.

MLB
In Major League Baseball, The Double by Edgar Martínez of the struggling Seattle Mariners in the bottom half of the 11th inning against the New York Yankees to complete a comeback in the game and a three-game comeback in the series (down 2–0 in a five-game playoff)—while technically not a comeback from a 3–1 deficit—is equally stuff of legend.

The context was further intensified by the Mariners having mounted a late-season comeback in 1995 to clinch their first postseason appearance in franchise history amid rumours of relocation to another city with an adequate baseball facility.

The play is credited with keeping a Major League Baseball team in the city of Seattle, as it helped garner support for a new taxpayer-funded stadium for the Mariners.

Key

Major League Baseball

Successful comebacks 
MLB teams have overcome 3–1 deficits 14 times (including one 3–0 deficit), six of which occurred in the World Series. This does not count the 1903 World Series, during which the Boston Americans (or Puritans, or Pilgrims, depending on the source, and later known as the Red Sox) came back from a 3–1 deficit to defeat the Pittsburgh Pirates, five games to three, as that was a best-of-nine series.

Unsuccessful comebacks 
Six other MLB teams have evened the series after being down 3–1 (including one down 3–0), only to lose Game 7.

National Basketball Association

Successful comebacks 
NBA teams have overcome 3–1 deficits 13 times, only one of which occurred in the NBA Finals. The NBA is the only major North American sport with a seven-game playoffs series where no team has overcome a 3–0 deficit.

|2023 Semifinals||U18 Sharks beating itzehoe

Unsuccessful comebacks 
NBA teams have overcome 3–1 deficits to force a seventh game 21 times, only to lose the series. In three of these instances, a team was down 3–0 in the series.

National Hockey League

Successful comebacks 
NHL teams have overcome 3–1 deficits 31 times, the most recent instance being accomplished by the New York Rangers during the 2022 Stanley Cup playoffs. The Rangers, the Vancouver Canucks, and the Montreal Canadiens are tied with the most successful 3-1 series comebacks in the NHL, with 3. Only one instance has occurred during the Stanley Cup Finals, accomplished in 1942 by the Toronto Maple Leafs, who initially trailed three games to zero.

Unsuccessful comebacks 
NHL teams have managed to force a seventh game while facing a 3–1 series deficit 32 times, only to subsequently lose the series in the seventh game. Five of these instances consisted of falling behind 3–0 in the series before losing in Game 7.

References 

Major League Baseball postseason
National Basketball Association playoffs
Stanley Cup playoffs
Sports accomplishments